Andrew Geddes is the name of:

 Andrew Geddes Bain (1797–1864), South African geologist, road engineer, palaeontologist and explorer
 Andrew Geddes (artist) (1783–1844), Scottish artist
 Andy Geddes (footballer, born 1922), Scottish footballer
 Andy Geddes (footballer, born 1959), Scottish footballer
 Andrew James Wray Geddes (1906–1988), British RAF officer

See also
 Andrew Geddis (1886–1976), businessman and sports enthusiast in Bombay